The women's singles competition for bowling at the 2019 Southeast Asian Games in Philippines was held on 3 December 2019 at Coronado Lanes, Starmall EDSA-Shaw.

Results 
Detailed result as in below:

References 

Women's singles